Sambas Regency is the most northerly regency in West Kalimantan Province of Indonesia. The regency is one of the original regencies in West Kalimantan. It covers 6,394.70 km2, and had a population of 496,120 at the 2010 census and 629,905 at the 2020 census; the official estimate as at mid 2021 was 637,811. The principal town lies at Sambas.

History 
The famous Sambas Treasure, a collection of 9th century Buddhist sculptures, was found near Sambas Town. It is now part of the British Museum's collection.

In the Sambas riots in 1999 Malays and Dayaks joined to massacre the Madurese during the conflict. Madurese were mutilated, raped, and killed by the Malays and Dayaks and 3,000 of them died in the massacres, with the Indonesian government doing little to stop the violence.

Adjoining Regencies and City

Population 
At the 2010 census, Sambas Regency had a population of 496,120, which by the 2020 census had grown to 629,905 people, with an average density of 98.5 people per km2.

Watershed 
Sambas has three watersheds (total: 516,200 ha): the Sambas watershed (258,700 ha), the Paloh watershed (64,375 ha), and the Sebangkau watershed (193,125 ha).

Administrative Districts 
Sambas Regency consists of nineteen districts (kecamatan), tabulated below with their areas and their populations at the 2010 census and the 2020 census, and the official estimates as at mid 2021 (rounded to nearest 100 persons). The table also includes the locations of the district administrative centres, the number of administrative villages (rural desa and urban kelurahan) in each district, and its post code.

List of Sambas Regents and Vice Regents

References

External links 
 General Condition of Sambas Regency - Official Site of Sambas Regency
 The Regent of Sambas Regency - Official Site of Sambas Regency
 The Vice Regent of Sambas Regency - Official Site of Sambas Regency

Regencies of West Kalimantan